The Surgeon is a 2005 Australian television medical drama. It screened at 9:30pm on Thursdays on Network Ten and in Ireland early morning on RTÉ One. The show was based at a fictional hospital named Sydney General Hospital.

The first season consisted of eight half-hour episodes. The show was nominated for two Logie Awards (Most Outstanding Drama Series & Most Outstanding Actress) as well as two AACTAs (Best Lead Actress in a Television Drama and Best Telefeature or Mini Series).

Cast 
Justine Clarke as Dr. Eve Agius
Sam Worthington as Dr. Sam Dash
Nicholas Bell as Dr. Julian Sierson
Christopher Morris as Dr. Abe Morris
Katie Wall as Siobhan Kerry
Matthew Newton as Dr. Nick Steele
Matthew Zeremes as Dr. Lachie Hatsatouris
Khalid Malik as Dr. Rob Singh
Chum Ehelepola as Dr. Ravi Jayawardener

Episodes 
(Episode information retrieved from Australian Television Information Archive).

Credits theme 
"Kid You're A Dreamer" by Perth band The Panics from their first album A House on a Street in a Town I'm From was used as the opening credits theme music for the series.

References

External links
The Surgeon at the National Film and Sound Archive
 

2005 Australian television series debuts
2005 Australian television series endings
Australian medical television series
Network 10 original programming
Television series by Endemol Australia
Television shows set in New South Wales